365 Nights in Hollywood is a 1934 American Pre-Code drama film directed by George Marshall and starring Alice Faye and James Dunn.

Cast
 James Dunn as James 'Jimmy' Dale
 Alice Faye as Alice Perkins
 Frank Mitchell as Percy
 Grant Mitchell as J. Walter Delmar
 John Qualen as Prof. Herman Ellenbogen

External links

1934 films
1930s musical drama films
American musical drama films
American black-and-white films
Films directed by George Marshall
Fox Film films
1934 drama films
1930s English-language films
1930s American films